The Tandy 10 Business Computer System was a short-lived product developed by Radio Shack in the late 1970s as a business-oriented complement to their TRS-80 Model I desktop computer. Released in 1978, the Tandy 10 was built for Radio Shack by Applied Digital Data Systems (ADDS), and was only sold by Radio Shack's dedicated computer center stores.

The computer itself was about the size of a two-drawer filing cabinet, with a monitor and keyboard built into a desk-shaped console, along with two 8-inch floppy drives vertically mounted in the pedestal.   Its features included:

 8080 CPU
 48K memory
 24x80 video display
 Two dual-sided 8" diskette drives
 Dartmouth BASIC
 ADOS Disk Operating System

Optional:
 Fortran IV language
 Assembly Language program language

The original ADDS machine, the System 50, was intended to be used as a data entry system and not as a standalone computer.  The original "language" it contained was actually a form designer; data was then entered into the form and then "sent" via RS-232 to a mainframe.  Since it had a microprocessor, Tandy matched it up with Peachtree Accounting software in an attempt to market it as a business computer.

The system did not sell in large numbers. Radio Shack's next business system was an extension of the TRS-80 product line, the TRS-80 Model II, released in May 1979. The Tandy 10 was discontinued in late 1980.

References

External links 
Tandy 10 at the Computer History Museum
ADDS System 50 advertisement, Computerworld, Mar 27, 1978

Early microcomputers
RadioShack